Women have a long history in American baseball and many women's teams have existed over the years. Baseball was played at women's colleges in New York and New England as early as the mid-nineteenth century; teams were formed at Vassar College, Smith College, Wellesley College, and Mount Holyoke College. An African American women's team, the Philadelphia Dolly Vardens, was formed in 1867.

A number of women's barnstorming teams have existed, and women have played alongside major league players in exhibition games. On April 2, 1931, 17-year-old Jackie Mitchell (originally known as "Virne Beatrice Mitchell Gilbert")  of the Chattanooga Lookouts struck out both Babe Ruth and Lou Gehrig in an exhibition game. Commissioner of Baseball Kenesaw Mountain Landis voided her contract as a result. The first girl to play on a boys varsity high school baseball team was Nellie Twardzik, on April 24, 1935. Twardzik started at first base for the Bartlett High School Indians in Webster, Massachusetts from 1935 through 1937. Her high school letter and glove are on display in the "Diamond Dreams" exhibit featuring women in baseball at the National Baseball Hall of Fame in Cooperstown, New York.

In 1946, former player Edith Houghton became the first woman to work as an independent scout in Major League Baseball when she was hired by the Philadelphia Phillies of the National League. In 1989, NBC's Gayle Gardner became the first woman to regularly host Major League Baseball games for a major television network. In 2015, Jessica Mendoza was the first female analyst for a Major League Baseball game in the history of ESPN, and Margaret Donahue (1892–1978) was the first non-owner female front office executive in Major League Baseball, starting as a stenographer for the Chicago Cubs in 1919 before becoming the team's corporate secretary in 1926 and team vice president and executive secretary before she retired in 1958.

Effa Manley, the only woman member of the National Baseball Hall of Fame (inducted 2006), co-owned the Newark Eagles baseball franchise in the Negro leagues from 1935 to 1948.

Early history
Women were playing base ball (as it was then called) as far back as the 1860s, but it was not normal for young women to play what was considered a man's sport. In fact, until the early 1890s, when the bicycle craze hit America, women who wanted to get some outdoor exercise were usually discouraged from doing so. Nevertheless, baseball was played at women's colleges in New York and New England as early as the mid-nineteenth century; teams were formed at Vassar College, Smith College, Wellesley College, and Mount Holyoke College. An African American women's team, the Philadelphia Dolly Vardens, was formed in 1867.

In the late 1890s, there were some organized efforts to have all-female baseball teams, several of which enjoyed success. One of the most successful was the Boston Bloomer Girls baseball club; they took their name from the comfortable pants that some sports-minded young women had begun to wear instead of a long skirt. Young women who went against traditional fashion norms and chose bloomers were often called "bloomer girls". While in some cities, local authorities banned women's baseball teams, including the Bloomer Girls, in other cities, the club was welcomed by curious fans who had never seen female ballplayers.

The Bloomer Girls toured the United States in 1897; the press referred to them as the "champion women's club of the world", although this may have been marketing hyperbole, given that the team often seemed inexperienced and did not play very well. One regular standout for the Bloomers was pitcher Maud Nelson, whose talents as a player were praised by reporters; but her teammates did not seem to have as much polish or skill as she did. As they gained more experience, they began to play with more confidence; while still regarded as a novelty, the club often drew large crowds of appreciative fans, many of whom came to see Maud Nelson and her curve ball.  The Boston Bloomers were still touring and playing baseball in the early 1900s; by 1907–1908, their team also included several male players, but the majority of the team continued to be female.

Margaret Donahue (1892–1978) was the first non-owner female front office executive in Major League Baseball, starting as a stenographer for the Chicago Cubs in 1919 before becoming the team's corporate secretary in 1926 and team vice president and executive secretary before she retired in 1958.

1920s–present
Although female teams like the Bloomers were always considered a novelty, by the early 1920s, there were several female players who were attracting attention at the amateur and semi-pro level and were considered talented enough to play for all-male teams.  Perhaps the best known young woman playing baseball in the early 1920s was Rhode Island's Lizzie Murphy.  A first baseman, she played for the Providence (RI) Independents, and was praised by newspaper reporters for her fielding skills.  Sportswriters said she was every bit as talented as a male player, and noted that she was paid $300 a week, more than many minor league players of the 1920s received. Murphy, who had begun playing baseball when she was only ten, had dreams of becoming a major league player, but she was not able to achieve that goal. She was, however, able to have a long career in the semi-pro leagues, leading a touring team that played all over the eastern United States.  According to newspaper accounts, she developed a loyal following, with numerous fans who came out to watch her and her team play. Lizzie Murphy's baseball career lasted from 1918 to 1935, and included one charity exhibition game in which she was part of a team of all-stars who played against the Boston Red Sox.

While Murphy was perhaps the best-known woman playing for an all-male team in the 1920s, there was at least one other woman athlete whose abilities included playing baseball.  Philadelphia's Betty Schenkel not only played baseball with the boys during high school, but she was said to be adept in other sports, including basketball, soccer, and cycling.

On April 2, 1931, 17-year-old Jackie Mitchell (originally known as "Virne Beatrice Mitchell Gilbert") of the Chattanooga Lookouts struck out both Babe Ruth and Lou Gehrig in an exhibition game. Commissioner of Baseball Kenesaw Mountain Landis voided her contract as a result. 

The first girl to play on a boys varsity high school baseball team was Nellie Twardzik, on April 24, 1935. Twardzik started at first base for the Bartlett High School Indians in Webster, Massachusetts from 1935 through 1937. Her high school letter and glove are on display in the "Diamond Dreams" exhibit featuring women in baseball at the National Baseball Hall of Fame in Cooperstown, New York.

Effa Manley, the only woman member of the National Baseball Hall of Fame (inducted 2006), co-owned the Newark Eagles baseball franchise in the Negro leagues from 1935 to 1948.

World War II through 1950
During World War II, over 500 baseball players, including super-stars like Ted Williams, Stan Musial and Joe DiMaggio, were drafted. This left major league rosters depleted and severely diminished the level of talent in the league. The owner of the Chicago Cubs, Philip K. Wrigley formed a committee to come up with ideas to keep baseball financially afloat during the war. The result of that committee was the organization of the All-American Girls Professional Baseball League, which operated from 1943 to 1954. At the height of its popularity, it had teams in twelve cities. One of the most successful of the teams in the league was the Rockford (IL) Peaches, which won four championships. The Peaches, and the All-American Girls Professional Baseball League, were commemorated in a 1992 movie, A League of Their Own, starring Geena Davis. In 2022, the television series A League of Their Own, co-created by Will Graham and Abbi Jacobson, was an adaptation of the 1992 movie with new characters and storylines, about the formation of a World War II-era women's professional baseball team.

Founded for similar reasons as the AAGPBL, the National Girls Baseball League was in operation from 1944 to 1954.

In 1946, former player Edith Houghton became the first woman to work as an independent scout in Major League Baseball when she was hired by the Philadelphia Phillies of the National League.

1950s–1990s 
There not being a rule against it, 12-year-old Kathryn Johnston of Corning, New York became the first girl to play Little League Baseball in 1950. Johnson played first base for the King's Dairy team. After that, a rule prohibited girls from playing in Little League; this was in force until 1974. In the final week of December 1974, President Gerald Ford signed into law a bill that opened the Little League baseball program to girls.

In 1952 Major League Baseball began a ban on the signing of women to contracts, a ban that lasted until 1992.

The Indianapolis Clowns of the Negro leagues were the first professional baseball team to hire a female player to a long-term contract that was not voided soon after. In an effort to replace Hank Aaron, who had left the team the previous year, the Clowns hired Toni Stone to play second base with the team in 1953, in which she batted .243. 

In 1988, Julie Croteau was recognized as the first woman to play men's NCAA baseball.

Starting in 1989 and continuing to date (July 2021), Janet Marie Smith oversaw multiple MLB stadium projects for the Baltimore Orioles, the Atlanta Braves, the Boston Red Sox, and the Los Angeles Dodgers. Smith directed the design of Baltimore's Oriole Park at Camden Yards which marked a new era of MLB parks. Camden Yards was the first of the "Retro Ballparks," and was unique in that it honored many qualities of ballparks from the classic era ballparks like Fenway Park and Wrigley Field, but also incorporated modern elements and building techniques to improve the overall fan experience as well as the views. Smith's work in major league baseball stadium design and renovation has influenced ballpark design since 1992. "Every ballpark built since Oriole Park’s opening owes some debt of its design to that park." Oriole Park became known as "the Baltimore ballpark that changed baseball." Janet Marie Smith's "fingerprints are all over baseball."

In 1992 Major League Baseball lifted a ban on the signing of women to contracts, a ban that had begun in 1952.

Since 1992, the San Francisco Giants have employed older men as “balldudes”, instead of the traditional youths. In 1993, Corinne Mullane became the first "balldudette", and she and her daughter Molly, who began working as a balldudette in the 2000s, have since been included in the National Baseball Hall of Fame as the first mother-daughter ball-retrieving duo in baseball.

In the 1993 MLB draft, the Chicago White Sox drafted left handed pitcher Carey Schueler in the 43rd round. She was the first woman ever drafted by a Major League Baseball team.

In 1994, the Colorado Silver Bullets women's professional baseball team was founded, in which the women players barnstormed around the country playing men's professional and semi-professional teams. They won six of 40 games in their inaugural season, improving to a final winning season of 23–22 in their final year, 1997. Croteau played with the Colorado Silver Bullets in its inaugural season. After one season, she and teammate Lee Anne Ketcham joined the Maui Stingrays of the Hawaii Winter Baseball League, becoming the first women to play in the Major League Baseball-sanctioned league.

In 1995, Ila Borders became the first woman to start as pitcher in a men's collegiate baseball game.

2000s
Effa Manley, the only woman member of the National Baseball Hall of Fame, was inducted into it in 2006. She co-owned the Newark Eagles baseball franchise in the Negro leagues from 1935 to 1948.

In 2008, Eri Yoshida, at 16 years old, became Japan's first professional female baseball player to play in a men's league by signing a professional contract with a new Japanese independent league. In April 2010, she signed a contract with the Chico Outlaws, becoming the first woman to play professionally in two countries.

In 2008, Mamie "Peanut" Johnson was drafted (at age 72) by the Washington Nationals in a special Negro leagues honorary draft that preceded 2008 Major League Baseball draft, marking the first time a woman was drafted in the MLB's yearly new player draft.

In 2009, Justine Siegal became the first female coach of a men's professional baseball team. In 2011, she was the first woman to throw batting practice to an MLB team, the Cleveland Indians at spring training. She also threw BP to the Oakland Athletics, Tampa Bay Rays, St. Louis Cardinals, Houston Astros, and New York Mets. In 2015, Siegal became the Oakland Athletics guest instructor for their Instructional League Club, thus making her the first female coach in major league baseball history.

On August 15, 2014, Mo'ne Davis was the first girl in Little League World Series history to pitch a winning game (for the Taney Dragons), which also made her the first girl to pitch a shutout in Little League postseason history.

For one day in May 2016, Jennie Finch was a guest manager for the Bridgeport Bluefish of the Atlantic League, becoming the first woman to manage a professional baseball team. The team played and won one game that day.

In 2016, the Sonoma Stompers of the Pacific Association, an independent baseball league, signed Kelsie Whitmore and Stacy Piagno; they became the first female teammates in professional baseball since the 1950s in the Negro Leagues. Whitmore pitched to Anna Kimbrell during a game in 2016, forming the first all-female battery since the All-American Girls Professional Baseball League.

In January 2021, Boston Red Sox hired Bianca Smith as a minor league coach. With the hire, Smith was the first black woman to become a coach in professional baseball. On January 11, 2022, the Yankees announced that Rachel Balkovec would manage the Low-A Tampa Tarpons in 2022, making her the first woman to manage in affiliated baseball.

In May 2022, Kelsie Whitmore signed with the Staten Island FerryHawks of the Atlantic League, and started a game for them in left field; this made her the first woman to start an Atlantic League of Professional Baseball game. Slightly later in May she became the first woman to pitch in an Atlantic League game when she made her first pitching appearance for Staten Island; entering the game with the bases loaded and two outs, she retired Ryan Jackson, a former major leaguer, on a fly out to end the inning.

Jaida Lee, at 16 years old, was in August 2022 the first female to compete in men’s baseball at the Canada Summer Games.

In November 2022, Olivia Pichardo became the first woman chosen for any Division I baseball roster when she was chosen for that of Brown University. Pichardo became the first woman to play in a Division I baseball game on March 17, 2023, pinch-hitting for Brown University.

In January 2023, Veronica Gajownik was hired to manage the Hillsboro Hops, which made her the first woman to manage a Class High-A baseball team, and the first openly LGBTQ manager in minor or major league baseball history.

Broadcasting
In 1989, NBC's Gayle Gardner became the first woman to regularly host Major League Baseball games for a major television network. In 1990, CBS Sports' Lesley Visser became the first woman to cover the World Series, serving as their lead field reporter. In addition to working the World Series from 1990–1993 for CBS, Visser covered the 1995 World Series for ABC Sports via The Baseball Network.

On August 3, 1993, Gayle Gardner became the first woman to do television play-by-play for a Major League Baseball game. It was the Colorado Rockies vs. Cincinnati Reds on KWGN-TV in Denver. Also in 1993, CBS' Andrea Joyce became the first woman to co-host the network television coverage of the World Series. Joyce co-hosted that particular World Series with Pat O'Brien.

In 1995, NBC's Hannah Storm not only became the first woman to serve as solo host a World Series game, but also the first woman to preside over the World Series Trophy presentation. In 2009, New York Yankees broadcaster Suzyn Waldman became the first woman to work a World Series game from the broadcast booth.

On July 2, 2015, Jenny Cavnar became the first woman to provide analysis for a series of National League games in the radio booth, filling in on KOA for the Colorado Rockies vs Arizona Diamondbacks. Cavnar would also become the fill-in play-by-play voice for the Colorado Rockies on April 23, 2018, when she stepped in the booth to call the San Diego Padres at Colorado Rockies. On August 24, 2015, Jessica Mendoza was the first female analyst for a Major League Baseball game in the history of ESPN, during a game between the St. Louis Cardinals and the Arizona Diamondbacks. John Kruk, Dan Shulman and Jessica Mendoza called the 2015 American League Wild Card Game on October 6, and Mendoza thus became the first female analyst in MLB postseason history. In October 2020 Mendoza became the first female World Series analyst on any national broadcast platform; she was on ESPN's radio platform.

On July 20, 2021, MLB produced its first-ever all-female broadcast of a game between the Baltimore Orioles and Tampa Bay Rays. The game was called by Melanie Newman, MLB.com writer Sarah Langs, and Alanna Rizzo. Heidi Watney and Lauren Gardner hosted the pregame and postgame shows. The game was broadcast live on YouTube. ESPN would do the same on September 29, 2021, with Newman and Mendoza calling a game between the San Diego Padres and Los Angeles Dodgers.

Umpires
There is evidence that at least one woman, Amanda Clement, was umpiring semi-professional games as early as 1905. "Mandy", as she was called, grew up near a ballpark in her hometown of Hudson, South Dakota, where she was introduced to baseball by her brother Henry. Clement began umpiring while a student at Yankton College, and gained fame nationwide for her knowledge of baseball and her accuracy in umpiring the games.  She was paid between $10 and $15 per game, which helped pay her tuition.  She umpired games in North Dakota, Iowa, Minnesota, Nebraska, and South Dakota until at least 1909, and later became a physical education instructor for high school and college women's teams. She still would umpire an occasional semi-pro game in South Dakota even during the 1910s. There were several other woman umpires in the early 1920s: one was Deana Ernest of Toledo, Ohio, who umpired semi-pro games in the area, and also managed a city league team there. Another was Nina Belle Hurst, a resident of Sawtelle, California, who umpired in the Southern California Baseball Managers Association.  During World War II, there were also some women who umpired, including some the press jokingly referred to as "WUMPS" (women umpires). Among them was Lorraine Heinisch, of Kenosha WI, who umpired semi-pro games in 1943, including a championship game in Wichita, Kansas.

The first woman to umpire a professional game was Bernice Gera.  A former Little League coach and a passionate fan of baseball, she entered umpiring school in 1967 (the first woman ever to attend the Fort Lauderdale Baseball School).  After a lengthy court battle with major league baseball, she finally won the right to umpire.  Her first pro game was in the minor leagues in June 1972—a game between the Auburn Phillies and Geneva Rangers in the New York-Penn League, but after several disputed calls, she decided to resign and never umpired another professional game.

In 1988 Pam Postema became the first female umpire to officiate a Major League Baseball spring training game, and the last until Ria Cortesio in 2007.

Executives
The first woman to own a baseball team was Helene Hathaway Britton, who owned the St. Louis Cardinals National League baseball team from 1911 through 1916. Margaret Donahue was the first female front office executive in Major League Baseball who was not an owner. She worked for the Chicago Cubs from 1919 to 1958 and introduced marketing concepts such as the season ticket and reduced prices for children under 12, both still used in the 2000s. Since then, many women have held executive positions in business and financial areas of Major League Baseball. Yet, there have not been many women who have become player personnel, though, there are women who have been hired as general managers (GMs) for minor league affiliates. However, these positions are not responsible for player personnel moves, since roster maneuvers are handled by front-office personnel of the minor league affiliate's major league parent team.

One woman who has a position in player personnel at the Major League level is Kim Ng. She first worked for the Chicago White Sox, where she successfully presented an arbitration case. After working for the American League as director of waivers and records, she was hired as Assistant GM by the New York Yankees. When she left the Yankees in 2001 for the same position with the Los Angeles Dodgers, the Yankees hired another woman to replace her, Jean Afterman. Afterman still holds the same position as of July 2015. Kim Ng later moved on to work for Major League Baseball as Senior Vice President of Baseball Operations. In 2020, she was hired by the Miami Marlins as the first woman and first Asian American to serve as general manager of an MLB team.

Coaching
Several women have made milestone firsts as coaches, including:
 Julie Croteau
 1993: Croteau becomes the first woman to coach men's NCAA baseball
 2004: Croteau was selected to be the third base coach for the United States Women's National Team, which captured the gold medal at the 2004 Women's World Cup of Baseball in Edmonton. 
 2006: Croteau was promoted to become the manager of the Women's National Team which won the Women's World Cup in Taiwan. She became the first woman to manage a women's baseball team to the gold medal in any international baseball competition.
 Rachel Balkovec
 2019: Balkovec became the first woman hired to be a full-time hitting coach for a Major League Baseball team.
 2022, the Yankees announced that Balkovec will manage the Low-A Tampa Tarpons in 2022, making her the first woman to manage in affiliated baseball. 
 Alyssa Nakken
 2020: Nakken became the first full-time female coach in Major League Baseball history and the first to coach on the field during a major league pre-season game. 
 2022: Nakken became first woman to coach on the field in a regular season major league game on April 12, 2022, when the Giants substituted Nakken into the game as the first base coach after Antoan Richardson was ejected during the top of the third inning of a game against the San Diego Padres.
 Bianca Smith
 2021: Smith was hired by the Boston Red Sox as a minor league coach, making her the first African American woman to serve as a coach in a professional baseball organization.

See also
 Women's baseball
 Baseball Hall of Fame
 Julie Croteau
 The Colorado Silver Bullets (1994–1997)
 Mo'ne Davis
 Nancy Faust
 Carey Schueler
 Alta Weiss
 Toni Stone, Mamie Johnson, Connie Morgan (the only three women to play in the Negro leagues)

Notes

References
 
 
 
Shattuck, Debra (c. 2015). Bloomer Girls: Women Baseball Pioneers. University of Illinois Press.

External links 
 The American Women's Baseball Federation
 Photographs of the Colorado Silver Bullets, 1994–1997
 Women In Sports

 
Major League Baseball